Qaleh-ye Meyan (also Romanized as Qal‘eh-ye Meyān; also known as Meyālū, Meyānlū, Mīānlū, Miāntū, Miyalu, Miyan Loo, Mīyānlū, and Qal‘eh Meyānlū) is a village in Howmeh Rural District, in the Central District of Kangan County, Bushehr Province, Iran. At the 2006 census, its population was 350, in 87 families.

References 

Populated places in Kangan County